The Filipino Academy of Movie Arts and Sciences bestowed a Centennial Award in the 46th FAMAS Awards (1997) in 1998 to celebrate the centennial of Philippine independence. The award was given to the films that honestly reflected Philippine culture and traditions in its entirety and that celebrated patriotism and love of country.

Recipients of the Centennial Award 
1997 (46th)
Rizal sa Dapitan
Damong Ligaw

References

FAMAS Award